William Thomas (also known as William Huw-Thomas) is a Welsh actor, who has appeared in many TV episodes and films. He made his first appearance on TV in 1974, and his work, as an actor, is still ongoing. He is known for his roles in two Doctor Who episodes, along with roles in other major TV programmes, including Only Fools and Horses and Midsomer Murders in 2007.

In 2011 he appeared as a regular in Torchwood: Miracle Day as Geraint Cooper; having previously played the character on a one-off occasion in 2008.

Filmography

References

External links

Year of birth missing (living people)
Living people
Welsh male television actors
Welsh male film actors